The Swatantra Thozhilali Union also known as Swatantra Trade Union  (STU) is the oldest trade union federation in India. It is associated with the Indian Union Muslim League

History
May 5, 1957 - That is when the Kerala State Independent Workers Union State Committee was formed. When the organization was born at the office of the Independent Handloom Workers Union in Valiyangadi, Kozhikode, there was no beating. All those present had vowed to undertake a great mission.
The organization was able to provide benefits to all workers and create better working conditions by eliminating labor exploitation.

Principal mass organizations of STU
State Construction Workers Union
Motor and Engineering Workers Union
Kerala Agricultural Workers Federation
State Headload and General Workers Union
Sewing Workers Union
Kerala Artists 'Skilled and General Workers' Union
Independent Fishermen's Union
Fish Supply Workers Union 
Real Estate Workers' Union
Heritage College Mystery Folk Medicine Federation
Newspaper Agent and Workers Union
Anganwadi Workers and Helpers Organization
Asha Workers Union
Innovative Marketing and Workers' Union
National Rural Employment Guarantee Scheme Workers Union

Notable leaders 
 E. T. Mohammed Basheer Member of Parliament, Lok Sabha and Former Minister of Education, Kerala | Kerala State Secretary of S.T.U
 V. K. Ebrahimkunju Kerala Minister for Industry and Social Welfare | Kerala State Vice President of S.T.U

See also
Indian Trade Unions
Indian Union Muslim League

External links

References

Trade unions in India
Labour movement in India